The Algeria national basketball team are the men's basketball side that represent Algeria in international competition, administered by the Fédération Algérienne de Basket-Ball.

The squad finished in the final four every time it hosted a major international basketball tournament including the African Basketball Championship and the All-Africa Games. They played in the 2002 FIBA World Championship in the United States where they finished 15th.

History
Algeria team took part in the World Cup for the first time in 2002. It drew into the 'Group of Death' (alongside host United States, eventual Bronze medal winner Germany and Asian champion China), the Algerian Team struggled at its first Basketball World Cup appearance. They lost their first preliminary round game against the United States 60-100 and also their second and third first-round games against China (82-96) and Germany (70-102). to a 4th place out of 4 finish. In their 2nd classification game, Algeria fared much better and dominated Lebanon to a 100-70 final score.

Competitive record

Arab Championship
 1981 Tunisia : 2nd
 1994 Egypt : 2nd
 2000 Algeria : 2nd
 2005 Saudi Arabia : Winner
 2015 Egypt: 2nd
 2018 Egypt: 2nd
 2022 Dubai : 3rd

Mediterranean Games
 2005 Almería: 7th
 2022 Oran: 5th (3×3)

Islamic Solidarity Games
2005 Saudi Arabia : 2nd

Roster
Team for the 2015 FIBA Africa Championship.

|}
| valign="top" |
Head coach

Legend
Club – describes lastclub before the tournament
Age – describes ageon 19 August 2015
|}

Notable players
There are several Algerian players playing professionally in Europe, mostly in France. As of 2010/2011, two play in the top level division.
 Ali Bouziane (JDA Dijon)
 Ahmed Fellah (Entente Orléanaise 45)

Head coach position
  Faid Bilal: 2000–2002 
  Ahmed Loubachria:2007-2009
  Ali Filali:2009-2010
  Sean Whalen: 2010-2013
  Faid Bilal:  2013-2014
  Ali Filali: 2014-2015
  Ahmed Loubachria: 2016-2017
  Mohamed Yahya: 2018-2019
  Faid Bilal: 2019- Dec 2021
  Ahmed Bendjabou: 2022- now

Kit

Manufacturer
2015: Peak

Sponsor
2015: Ooredoo

References

External links
Algeria Basketball Portal 
Africabasket – Algeria Men National Team
FIBA Profile

Basketball in Algeria
Men's national basketball teams
Basketball
1963 establishments in Algeria